The MacArthur Park Historic District encompasses a remarkably well-preserved collection of Victorian buildings in the heart of Little Rock, Arkansas.  The main focal point of the district is MacArthur Park, site of the Tower Building of the Little Rock Arsenal and Little Rock's 19th-century military arsenal.  The district extends north and west from the park for about four blocks, to East Capitol Avenue in the north and Scott Street to the west, and extends south, beyond Interstate 630, to East 17th Street.  This area contains some of the city's finest surviving antebellum and late Victorian architecture, including an particularly large number (19) of Second Empire houses, and achieved its present form roughly by the 1880s. The MacArthur Park Historic District was listed on the National Register of Historic Places in 1977.

See also
List of places named for Douglas MacArthur
National Register of Historic Places listings in Little Rock, Arkansas

References

 
Greek Revival architecture in Arkansas
Historic districts in Little Rock, Arkansas
Historic districts on the National Register of Historic Places in Arkansas
Park Historic District
National Register of Historic Places in Little Rock, Arkansas
Parks on the National Register of Historic Places in Arkansas
Victorian architecture in Arkansas